Oskyldigt dömd (English title: Verdict Revised) is a Swedish drama television series released in 2008. The first season was recorded in twelve episodes during February 2008 to be aired later during the fall. It premiered on the Finnish TV channel FST5 on 24 September 2008 and later the same evening on Swedish TV4. The series is produced by Filmlance. On 23 January TV4 announced that Mikael Persbrandt would be playing the main character and on 10 February other cast members were announced; Helena af Sandeberg, Sofia Ledarp, Marie Richardson and Mirja Turestedt. TV4 also announced that they had started to work on the second season before the first had even been aired., the first season was written by Johan Zollitsch, Jan Arnald, Karin Gidfors and Hans Rosenfeldt but the second one is written by Thomas Borgström and Sara Heldt. Filming the second season took place during spring 2009. TV4 refused to say how much money the filming has cost the channel, but they confirm that "a lot of money" has been used.

Plot
Markus Haglund (Mikael Persbrandt) is a controversial professor of criminal law who fights for those who have been innocently convicted. Along with his four law students, Fia Jönsson (Sofia Ledarp), Anna Sjöstedt (Helena af Sandeberg), Belal Al-Mukhtar (Francisco Sobrado) and Roger Andersson (Leonard Terfelt), he helps the convicted fight for their innocence.

At Uppsala University, he leads a class called Oskyldigt dömd (innocently convicted).

Cast

Episodes

Season 1

Season 2

References

External links 
 

TV4 (Sweden) original programming
Swedish drama television series